Viswema is a Southern Angami Naga village located in Nagaland.

Viswema may also refer to:
 Viswema Hall, a multi-purpose arena currently under construction

See also